Abraxas, the magpie moths, is a genus of moths in the family Geometridae. It was first described by William Elford Leach in 1815.

Description
Palpi porrect (extending forward) and roughly scaled. Hind tibia of male dilated with a fold containing a tuft of hair. Forewings with vein 3 from before angle of cell and veins 7, 8, 9 and 10, 11 stalked. Vein 11 becoming coincident with vein 12, or apparently absent. Hindwings with vein 3 from before angle of cell.

Species
The genus includes the following species:

 Abraxas adilluminata Inoue, 1984
 Abraxas albiplaga (Warren, 1894)
 Abraxas albiquadrata (Warren, 1897)
 Abraxas antinebulosa Inoue, 1984
 Abraxas breueri Stüning & Hausmann, 2002
 Abraxas capitata Warren, 1894
 Abraxas celidota Wehrli, 1931
 Abraxas consputa Bastelberger, 1909
 Abraxas cupreilluminata Inoue, 1984
 Abraxas degener Warren, 1894
 Abraxas disrupta Warren, 1894
 Abraxas expectata Warren, 1902
 Abraxas flavimacula (Warren, 1896)
 Abraxas flavisinuata Warren, 1894
 Abraxas fletcheri Inoue, 1984
 Abraxas formosilluminata Inoue, 1984
 Abraxas fulvobasalis Warren, 1894
 Abraxas gephyra West, 1929
 Abraxas grossulariata (Linnaeus, 1758) – magpie
 Abraxas illuminata Warren, 1894
 Abraxas incolorata Warren, 1894
 Abraxas intermedia Warren, 1888
 Abraxas interpunctata Warren, 1905
 Abraxas intervacuata (Warren, 1896)
 Abraxas invasata Warren, 1897
 Abraxas karafutonis Matsumura, 1925
 Abraxas labraria Guenée, 1857
 Abraxas latifasciata Warren, 1894
 Abraxas leucostola Hampson, 1893
 Abraxas martaria Guenée, 1857
 Abraxas membranacea Warren, 1894
 Abraxas metamorpha Warren, 1893
 Abraxas miranda Butler, 1878
 Abraxas niphonibia Wehrli, 1935
 Abraxas notata Warren, 1894
 Abraxas pantaria (Linnaeus, 1767) – light magpie
 Abraxas parvimiranda Inoue, 1984
 Abraxas paucinotata Warren, 1894
 Abraxas persimplex Inoue, 1984
 Abraxas picaria Moore, [1868]
 Abraxas placata Inoue, 1984
 Abraxas privata Bastelberger, 1905
 Abraxas punctifera (Walker, [1865])
 Abraxas pusilla Butler, 1880
 Abraxas satoi Inoue, 1972
 Abraxas sinopicaria Wehrli, 1934
 Abraxas sordida Hampson, 1893
 Abraxas sporocrossa Turner, 1922
 Abraxas stictotaenia Wehrli, 1932
 Abraxas stresemanni Rothschild, 1915
 Abraxas subhyalinata Röber, 1891
 Abraxas submartiaria Wehrli, 1932
 Abraxas suffusa Warren, 1894
 Abraxas suspecta (Warren, 1894)
 Abraxas sylvata (Scopoli, 1763) – clouded magpie
 Abraxas symmetrica Warren, 1894
 Abraxas taiwanensis Inoue, 1984
 Abraxas tenellula Inoue, 1984
 Abraxas tenuisuffusa Inoue, 1984
 Abraxas triseriaria Herrich-Schäffer, [1855]
 Abraxas wilemani Inoue, 1984

References

External links

Abraxini
Geometridae genera